Ethmia elimatella is a moth in the family Depressariidae. It was described by Aleksandr Sergeievich Danilevsky in 1975. They can be found in Azerbaijan.

References

Moths described in 1975
elimatella